Chicago, Madison and Northern Railroad may refer to:

Chicago, Madison and Northern Railroad (1886–1903), predecessor of the Illinois Central Railroad
Chicago, Madison and Northern Railroad (1980–1982), predecessor of the Wisconsin and Southern Railroad